Lisch is a surname. Notable people with the surname include:

Juste Lisch (1828–1910), French architect
Karl Lisch (1907–1999), Austrian ophthalmologist
Kevin Lisch (born 1986), Australian basketball player
Michael Lisch (born 1990), American soccer player
Rusty Lisch (born 1956), American football player